This was the first edition of the tournament.

Laura Siegemund won the title, defeating Viktória Kužmová in the final, 6–2, 6–2.

Seeds

Draw

Finals

Top half

Bottom half

References

External links
Main Draw

Carinthian Ladies Lake's Trophy - Singles